The Williamsbridge Oval is a park located in Norwood, Bronx, New York City. It is listed in the National Register of Historic Places.

History
The Williamsbridge Oval Park was built on the site of the Williamsbridge Reservoir after the reservoir was drained and the land transferred to the Parks Department in 1934. The park 
was funded, designed, and built by the Works Progress Administration under the supervision of the New York City Parks Department and was officially opened on September 11, 1937.

Attractions
Williamsbridge Oval has multiple playgrounds, tennis courts, basketball courts, plus an athletic field, a 400m 4-lane running track, a dog run, playground spray showers, ornamental flower beds and walking paths shaded by trees.

The original 1930s recreation center was reopened in 2013 after extensive renovations.

The park hosts community and NYC Parks sponsored events all year round.

In popular culture
 In Penny Marshall's film Awakenings (1990), Robin Williams' and Robert De Niro's characters are filmed taking a walk through the Williamsbridge Oval park.

Image gallery

References

External links
 New York City Department of Parks and Recreation Williamsbridge Oval Park Page
 New York City Department of Parks and Recreation Williamsbridge Oval Recreation Center Page
 Friends of the Williamsbridge Oval
 Bronx New Deal - Williamsbridge Oval

Parks in the Bronx
Urban public parks
Norwood, Bronx
Works Progress Administration in New York City
Parks on the National Register of Historic Places in New York City
National Register of Historic Places in the Bronx
1937 establishments in New York City
Tennis venues in New York City
American football venues in New York City